Collegiate Gothic is an architectural style subgenre of Gothic Revival architecture, popular in the late-19th and early-20th centuries for college and high school buildings in the United States and Canada, and to a certain extent Europe. A form of historicist architecture, it took its inspiration from English Tudor and Gothic buildings. It has returned in the 21st century in the form of prominent new buildings at schools and universities including Princeton, Washington University, and Yale.

Ralph Adams Cram, arguably the leading Gothic Revival architect and theoretician in the early 20th century, wrote about the appeal of the Gothic for educational facilities in his book The Gothic Quest: "Through architecture and its allied arts we have the power to bend men and sway them as few have who depended on the spoken word. It is for us, as part of our duty as our highest privilege to act...for spreading what is true."

History

Beginnings
Gothic Revival architecture was used for American college buildings as early as 1829, when "Old Kenyon" was completed on the campus of Kenyon College in Gambier, Ohio. Another early example was Alexander Jackson Davis's University Hall (1833–37, demolished 1890), on New York University's Washington Square campus. Richard Bond's church-like library for Harvard College, Gore Hall (1837–41, demolished 1913), became the model for other library buildings. James Renwick, Jr.'s Free Academy Building (1847–49, demolished 1928), for what is today City College of New York, continued in the style. Inspired by London's Hampton Court Palace, Swedish-born Charles Ulricson designed Old Main (1856–57) at Knox College in Galesburg, Illinois.

Following the Civil War, many idiosyncratic High Victorian Gothic buildings were added to the campuses of American colleges. Examples include Worcester Polytechnic Institute (Boynton Hall, 1868, by Stephen C. Earle); Yale College (Farnam Hall, 1869–70, by Russell Sturgis); the University of Pennsylvania (College Hall, 1870–72, Thomas W. Richards); Harvard College (Memorial Hall, 1870–77, William Robert Ware and Henry Van Brunt); and Cornell University (Sage Hall (1871–75, Charles Babcock). In 1871, English architect William Burges designed a row of vigorous French Gothic-inspired buildings for Trinity College – Seabury Hall, Northam Tower, Jarvis Hall (all completed 1878) – in Hartford, Connecticut.

Tastes became more conservative in the 1880s, and "collegiate architecture soon after came to prefer a more scholarly and less restless Gothic."

Movement
Beginning in the late-1880s, Philadelphia architects Walter Cope and John Stewardson expanded the campus of Bryn Mawr College in an understated English Gothic style that was highly sensitive to site and materials. Inspired by the architecture of Oxford and Cambridge universities, and historicists but not literal copyists, Cope & Stewardson were highly influential in establishing the Collegiate Gothic style. Commissions followed for collections of buildings at the University of Pennsylvania (1895–1911), Princeton University (1896–1902), and Washington University in St. Louis (1899–1909), marking the nascent beginnings of a movement that transformed many college campuses across the country.

In 1901, the firm of Shepley, Rutan & Coolidge created a master plan for a Collegiate Gothic campus for the fledgling University of Chicago, then spent the next 15 years completing it. Some of their works, such as the Mitchell Tower (1901–1908), were near-literal copies of historic buildings.

George Browne Post designed the City College of New York's new campus (1903–1907) at Hamilton Heights, Manhattan, in the style.

The style was experienced up-close by a wide audience at the 1904 Louisiana Purchase Exposition in St. Louis, Missouri. The World's Fair and 1904 Olympic Games were held on the newly completed campus of Washington University, which delayed occupying its buildings until 1905.

The movement gained further momentum when Charles Donagh Maginnis designed Gasson Hall at Boston College in 1908. Maginnis & Walsh went on to design Collegiate Gothic buildings at some twenty-five other campuses, including the main buildings at Emmanuel College (Massachusetts), and the law school at the University of Notre Dame.

Ralph Adams Cram designed a series of Collegiate Gothic buildings for the Princeton University Graduate College (1911–1917).

James Gamble Rogers did extensive work at Yale University, beginning in 1917. Some critics claim he took historicist fantasy to an extreme, while others choose to focus on what is widely considered to be the resulting beautiful and sophisticated Yale campus. Rogers was criticized by the growing Modernist movement. His cathedral-like Sterling Memorial Library (1927–1930), with its ecclesiastical imagery and lavish use of ornament, came under vocal attack from one of Yale's own undergraduates:

A modern building constructed for purely modern needs has no excuse for going off in an orgy of meretricious medievalism and stale iconography.

Other architects, notably John Russell Pope and Bertram Goodhue (who just before his death sketched the original version of Yale's Sterling Library from which Rogers worked), advocated for and contributed to Yale's particular version of Collegiate Gothic.

When McMaster University moved to Hamilton, Ontario, Canadian architect William Lyon Somerville designed its new campus (1928–1930) in the style.

Origins of the term

American architect Alexander Jackson Davis is "generally credited with coining the term" documented in a handwritten description of his own "English Collegiate Gothic Mansion" of 1853 for the Harrals of Bridgeport, Connecticut.  By the 1890s, the movement was known as "Collegiate Gothic".

1904 commentary
In his praise for Cope & Stewardson's Quadrangle Dormitories at the University of Pennsylvania, architect Ralph Adams Cram revealed some of the racial and cultural implications underlying the Collegiate Gothic:

Culmination

Collegiate Gothic complexes were most often horizontal compositions, save for a single tower or towers serving as an exclamation.

At the University of Pittsburgh, Charles Klauder was commissioned by University of Pittsburgh chancellor John Gabbert Bowman to design a tall building in the form of a Gothic tower. What he produced, the Cathedral of Learning (1926–37), has been described as the literal culmination of late Gothic Revival architecture. A combination of Gothic spire and modern skyscraper, the steel-frame, limestone-clad, 42-story structure is both the world's second tallest university  building and Gothic-styled edifice.  The tower contain a half-acre Gothic hall supported only by its 52-foot (16 m) tall arches. It is accompanied by the campus's other Gothic Revival structures by Klauder, including the Stephen Foster Memorial (1935–1937) and the French Gothic Heinz Memorial Chapel (1933–1938).

21st-century revival
A number of colleges and universities have commissioned major new buildings in the Collegiate Gothic style in recent years. These include Princeton University's Whitman College, designed by Porphyrios Associates, and Benjamin Franklin College and Pauli Murray College, both designed by Robert A.M. Stern Architects, at Yale University. The University of Southern California's USC Village was created as an inexpensive post-modern nod to collegiate revival. (Harley Ellis Devereaux, 2017).

Architects of the Collegiate Gothic style

 Julian Abele
 Snowden Ashford
 Allen & Collens
 Cope & Stewardson
 Ralph Adams Cram
 William Augustus Edwards
 Philip H. Frohman
 Bertram Grosvenor Goodhue
 Charles C. Haight
 Guilbert and Betelle
 Charles Klauder
 Pond and Pond
 George Browne Post
 James Gamble Rogers
 Horace Trumbauer
 Dan Everett Waid
 David Webster
 York and Sawyer

Examples

Gallery

See also
 Gothic architecture
 Gothic Revival architecture
 Carpenter Gothic

References

Sources
 Bergin, T. G. Yale's Residential Colleges; the First Fifty Years. New Haven, CT: Yale University Press, 1983.
 Duke, Alex. Importing Oxbridge. New Haven: Yale University Press, 2006. 
 Lewis, Michael J., The Gothic Revival (London: Thames & Johnson Ltd., 2002). 
 Robinson, Deborah and Edmund P. Meade. "Traditional Becomes Modern: the Rise of Collegiate Gothic Architecture at American Universities." Conference paper presented at 'Second International Congress on Construction History', Queens' College, Cambridge University; 2006.

External links 
 

 

19th-century architectural styles
20th-century architectural styles
Articles containing video clips
American architectural styles
Revival architectural styles